The Washington Quarterly (abbreviated as TWQ) is a magazine of international affairs covering topics and issues concerning global security, diplomatic relations, and policy implications. Founded by prestigious think tank, Center for Strategic and International Studies, TWQ is published by the George Washington University's Elliott School of International Affairs, in Washington, DC.

History
The Washington Quarterly was founded in 1978 at the Center for Strategic and International Studies, one of the top think tanks in the United States. TWQ'''s original publisher was MIT Press.

In 2014, TWQ came under the patronage of the George Washington University, via the Elliott School of International Affairs. In 2008, TWQ'''s publishing agreement with MIT Press had ended and it began to be published by Taylor & Francis.

References

External links

The Washington Quarterly at Center for Strategic and International Studies
The Washington Quarterly at Project MUSE

Political magazines published in the United States
Quarterly magazines published in the United States
Elliott School of International Affairs
Magazines established in 1978
Magazines published in Washington, D.C.